The Rauze Viaduct is a concrete box-girder bridge (pont en poutre-caisson) in southern France, around 330 ft high, on European route E09 (international E-road network).

History

Design
The structural engineering was by SECOA (Société d'étude et de calculs en ouvrages d'art). It is a haunched girder bridge. The area is designated under Natura 2000 as a natural fauna ecological area, so none of the piers could be put in the river. The three central spans are 130m long, with the other outer spans being 91m and 74m long.

Construction
It was built by Dodin Campenon-Bernard, with the balanced cantilever method. Pre-stressing was by Spie Précontrainte (Spie Batignolles) of Cergy in Paris. 28,000 cubic metres of concrete were required; the limestone came from a quarry in Cahors. Steel fabrication was by SAMT of Saint-Chamas. The autoroute scheme was complete on 20 June 2001, and opened on 12 July 2001.

Structure
It is in the Lot department in the Occitanie region, 5 km north-west of Cahors.

See also
 Dordogne Viaduct, 1,070m long, also on the A20 autoroute, to the north

References

External links
 Structurae
 Construction

2001 establishments in France
Box girder bridges in France
Bridges completed in 2001
Concrete bridges in France
Transport in Occitania (administrative region)